Raagala 24 Gantallo is a 2019 Indian Telugu-language murder mystery directed by Srinivasa Reddy starring Satya Dev, Eesha Rebba, Sriram, Ganesh Venkatram and Musskan Sethi. The plot of the film is inspired by Agatha Christie's play The Unexpected Guest. The film was dubbed and released in Tamil as Varappogum 24 Manikul.

Plot
Three criminals, serving a jail term for murder, are on the run. They enter the house of ad filmmaker Rahul (Satyadev Kancharana) and Vidya (Eesha Rebba), who are a married couple.  Much to their shock, the criminals find that Rahul has been murdered by Vidya.  On her part, Vidya is trying to hide her husband's death.  

This is when she starts narrating her story to the criminals. Rahul was a perverted husband who suspected that Vidya had an affair with Ganesh (Ganesh Venkatraman), her college friend.  

The rest of the story is about what transpired between the husband-wife duo, how the criminals are tied to their story, and what role a cop (played by Sriram) has in all this.

Cast 
Satya Dev as Rahul
Eesha Rebba as Vidya
Sriram as Narasimha, a cop
Ganesh Venkatraman as Ganesh
Musskan Sethi as Meghana
Ravi Prakash
Krishna Bhagawan as Paul
Ravi Varma
Anurag
 Ayaj
 Devipriya
Abhinaya Krishna

Production 
After making several comedic films, director Srinivasa Reddy debuted in the thriller genre with this film. Sriram accepted to star in the film after listening to the film's script. Raghu Kunche was brought in to compose the music for the film. A motion poster was released in early September while a teaser was released at the end of September.The trailer released in November.

Soundtrack 
Raghu Kunche composed the film's score. The song "Narayanthe Namo Namo" was released by Y. V. Subba Reddy. Raghu Babu and Ali took part in the audio launch function. Devi Sri Prasad released the promotional song "Rebba". The second single, "Namo Namo", was released in October.

Release 
The Times of India gave the film a rating of two-and-a-half out of five stars and wrote that "Raagala 24 Gantallo is a classic case of a good script faltering in its execution. Unfortunately, this thriller leaves us with more questions than answers".The Hindu wrote that "Ragala 24 Gantallo as the title suggests, is an ominous warning to viewers who walk in to see the movie".

References

External links 

2010s Telugu-language films
2010s mystery thriller films
Indian mystery thriller films
Films scored by Raghu Kunche
 Murder mystery films
Films based on works by Agatha Christie